Lorena Johana Graña Fernández (born 18 February 1997) is a Uruguayan footballer who plays as a right back for CA Peñarol and the Uruguay women's national team.

International career
Graña represented Uruguay at the 2014 South American U-20 Women's Championship. She made her senior debut on 4 March 2019 in a 0–6 friendly loss to France.

References 

1997 births
Living people
Women's association football fullbacks
Uruguayan women's footballers
People from Canelones Department
Uruguay women's international footballers
Peñarol players
Colón F.C. players